The World Esports Association (WESA) is an esports association founded in 2016. After a year of development, it was founded by ESL along with many esports teams. Its founding members were Fnatic, Natus Vincere, Team EnVyUs, FaZe Clan, Virtus.pro, G2 Esports, North, Splyce, Mousesports, and Ninjas in Pyjamas. However, FaZe Clan dropped out of the organization just a day after it was unveiled due to fears of being locked in an exclusivity contract limiting the tournaments teams could play in.

See also
 G7 Teams - similar organization that lasted from 2008 to 2010

References

External links

Esports governing bodies
Sports organizations established in 2016
Sports governing bodies in Switzerland